Chalan or chalán may refer to:
 Chalan (music), the development of a raga in Hindustani classical music, closely related to the Pakad concept
 A ferry in México, usually for narrow crossings where there is not a bridge
 Chalan, alternate name of Chelan, Lorestan, a village in Iran